Villanova Truschedu, Bidda Noa Truschedu in sardinian language,  is a comune (municipality) in the Province of Oristano in the Italian region Sardinia, located about  northwest of Cagliari and about  northeast of Oristano.

Villanova Truschedu borders the following municipalities: Fordongianus, Ollastra, Paulilatino, Zerfaliu.

Demographic evolution

References

Cities and towns in Sardinia